Lieutenant-General Sir Arthur Edward McNamara  (1877–1949) was a British Army officer.

Military career
McNamara was commissioned into the Queen's Royal Regiment (West Surrey) as a second lieutenant on 20 February 1897, and promoted to lieutenant on 29 September 1898. He served as a signaling officer in South Africa during the Second Boer War (1899–1902), and after the end of this war returned to a regular commission with his regiment in November 1902.

He saw action in the First World War for which he was appointed a Companion of the Distinguished Service Order and a Companion of the Order of St Michael and St George. Towards the end of the war he commanded 99th Brigade.

McNamara became Commander of the 19th Indian Infantry Brigade in India in December 1923 and, after becoming Commandant of the Small Arms School in October 1926, he was appointed a Companion of the Order of the Bath in the 1928 Birthday Honours. After that he became brigadier on the general staff at Eastern Command in February 1929, General Officer Commanding 42nd (East Lancashire) Infantry Division in May 1933 and Director of Military Training in October 1933. He was advanced to Knight Commander of the Order of the Bath in the 1938 New Year Honours before retiring in August 1938.

References

1877 births
1949 deaths
Knights Commander of the Order of the Bath
Companions of the Order of St Michael and St George
Companions of the Distinguished Service Order
British Army generals of World War I
Queen's Royal Regiment officers
British Army lieutenant generals